The Historic Park Inn Hotel and City National Bank are two adjacent commercial buildings located in downtown Mason City, Iowa, United States which were designed in the Prairie School style by the renowned architect Frank Lloyd Wright. Completed in 1910, the Park Inn Hotel is the last remaining Frank Lloyd Wright-designed hotel in the world, of the six for which he was the architect of record. The City National Bank is one of only two remaining Frank Lloyd Wright-designed banks in the world. It was the first Frank Lloyd Wright-designed project in the state of Iowa, and today carries both major architectural and historical significance. In 1999, the Park Inn Hotel was named on the Iowa Historic Preservation Alliance's Most Endangered Properties List.

The Park Inn Hotel was the third hotel designed by Wright and served as the prototype for Midway Gardens in Chicago and the Imperial Hotel, Tokyo, which was torn down in 1968.

In 1907, when law partners James E. Blythe and J. E. E. Markley were looking for an architect to compete in quality with the eight-story bank building that would be built across the corner, they didn't hesitate to give the commission to Frank Lloyd Wright, a young architect who was building a reputation in the Chicago area. For them Wright would build a complex, multi-purpose building that would give them multiple income streams. Their law offices would be on the second floor of the building's narrower central waist and the hotel's east wing, surrounded on the south by a two-story banking room with rental office space above. On the north would be a 42-room hotel, with basement shops beneath the bank and hotel. Wright managed to pack all these functions into an aesthetically well-integrated building that architecturally would be the bridge between Wright's Prairie School period and his Midway Gardens and the Imperial Hotel to follow.

Construction
Wright's drawings of the bank and hotel are dated from as early as December 17, 1908. Construction began on April 1, 1909, with supervision by Wright until his departure for Europe in late October of that year. At that time, architect William Drummond, from Wright's Oak Park Studio in Oak Park, Illinois, took over supervision of the construction. During his subsequent visits, Drummond was commissioned to design a Prairie style home for a prominent Mason City family, not far away.

The law office of developer-owners Blythe and Markley opened for business on August 29, 1910, with the gala opening of the new hotel and bank buildings, two weeks later, on September 10. A month later, Wright returned to the Midwest from his year in Europe.

Despite its glossy, up-to-date appeal and choice location,  just west of Mason City's primary downtown intersection of Federal Avenue and State Street, overlooking Central Park from the south, the Park Inn Hotel struggled through a relatively short life. The building had simply cost too much, and the return on investment was simply too little. During its first ten years, the hotel seldom made a profit, and usually didn't. By 1922, the business was barely afloat, and the restaurant was closed more than it was open. Then, just when things could hardly get worse, disaster struck.

Nearby, overlooking Central Park from the west, the regal, stylish, 250-room Hotel Eadmar was newly-completed, and now open for business. The 250-room Eadmar, four massive stories of Edwardian elegance and comfort, made a powerful statement. On the other hand, with just 43 rooms, the Park Inn had very little to say. No longer stylish, now regarded as strictly second-class, the Park Inn couldn't compete. It soon went bankrupt, and closed for good in 1925.

Adding insult to injury, 1925 also saw the closure and liquidation of the City National Bank. It was quickly absorbed by another local bank, which, just a few months later, would itself fail. The nationwide farming crisis had, for Mason City, led to a banking crisis as well. By the end of 1925, four of the city's five banks had failed.

By early 1926, the worst seemed to be over. That year, the former City National Bank building and the former Park Inn Hotel, were sold, but as separate properties. The old bank building underwent an extensive, quite unsympathetic remodeling, then reopened as a new commercial venture in 1928. As for the Park Inn, the two upper floors were clumsily converted into small, cheap apartments. No longer a hotel, the building was renamed. in honor of its world-renown architect, becoming the Frank Lloyd Wright Apartments East and West.

For the next 45 years, the once-charming Park Inn would be anything but charming. The ground floor had hosted a multitude of different businesses - for a brief period, in the early 1970's, it had even been a strip club - and the two floors above were now cramped, dreary, just-getting-by apartments, the renters who chose them couldn't afford to be choosy. The building, in decline for years, now began to deteriorate. Finally, in 1972, the few remaining tenants were served notice, then were sent packing.

For the next 25 years, the building stood empty. Derelict and neglected, city residents and city leaders fretted, fussed, fumed, and fought about what to do with the dingy, shabby, all-too-conspicuous eyesore. Even the cachet of the architect's name meant little or nothing. In Mason City, most people didn't really know who Frank Lloyd Wright was, and those who did know didn't really care. Almost everyone knew, and most agreed, that the building wasn't really worth saving.

What almost no one knew, however, was that the Park Inn had been the only remaining hotel in the world designed by Frank Lloyd Wright, who, even years after his death, retained almost a legendary status as an architect. What's more, Wright had designed only six hotels to begin with - and five had long since been demolished. Now, the wrecking ball appeared to be taking aim at Number Six. Only then did Mason City realize what they had on their hands - and how very close they were, even then, to not having it at all.

Suddenly, seemingly overnight, Mason City had an architecturally, culturally, and historically significant treasure on their hands. But what they didn't have on their hands was much money, or much time. This realization became something of a call to arms. The people had to take action, to find the money, then to take the time to restore the Park Inn to its former glory. If they didn't, it would soon be out of their hands.

Renovation

The Park Inn Hotel received a complete interior and exterior renovation thanks to numerous grants, as well as coordination at the local level. This included a comprehensive restoration of the brick and terra-cotta façade, replacement of the art glass skylight windows, and a complete interior reconstruction.

Wright on the Park, Inc., the organization overseeing the work, purchased the adjacent City Bank Building and reunited the Park Inn Hotel with the City National Bank. The bank building was refitted with an elevator and provides six additional rooms for the hotel; the old bank lobby is now a hotel ballroom.

The restoration was completed in September 2011. It builds on Mason City's rich architectural heritage, which includes a history deep in Prairie School architecture from not just Wright, but many of his associates who built in Mason City, including Walter Burley Griffin, Marion Mahony Griffin, William Eugene Drummond, and Francis Barry Byrne.

Notes

 Storrer, William Allin. The Frank Lloyd Wright Companion. University Of Chicago Press, 2006,  (S.155)

External links

Wright on the Park, Inc.
Wright in Iowa
The official website of the Historic Park Inn Hotel
The Last Wright on Internet Movie Database

Hotel buildings completed in 1910
Buildings and structures in Mason City, Iowa
Frank Lloyd Wright buildings
Hotels in Iowa
Prairie School architecture in Iowa
Hotel buildings on the National Register of Historic Places in Iowa
Tourist attractions in Cerro Gordo County, Iowa
National Register of Historic Places in Mason City, Iowa
Individually listed contributing properties to historic districts on the National Register in Iowa